Thiloa is a genus of the plant family Combretaceae.

Species include:
Thiloa colombiana
Thiloa glaucocarpa
Thiloa gracilis
Thiloa inundata
Thiloa nitida
Thiloa paraguariensis
Thiloa schultzei
Thiloa stigmaria

Combretaceae
Myrtales genera